Secoisolariciresinol diglucoside (SDG)  is an antioxidant phytoestrogen present in flax, sunflower, sesame, and pumpkin seeds. In food, it can be found in commercial breads containing flaxseed.  It is a precursor of mammal lignans  which are produced in the colon from chemicals in foods.

Extraction 
Secoisolariciresinol diglucoside can be isolated from de-fatted (hexane extraction) flaxseed by extraction of the lignan polymer precursor with a water/acetone mixture, followed by acetone removal and alkaline hydrolysis.

Studies on biological effects 

Secoisolariciresinol diglucoside slows the growth of human breast cancer in mice.

Secoisolariciresinol diglucoside may different roles in people. For example, due to 400-500Da size limit for Blood–Brain Barrier permeability, in one assessment of a Grade IV histology group of adult patients diagnosed with malignant glioma, high intake of secoisolariciresinol (for highest tertile compared to lowest tertile, in all cases) was associated with poorer survival.

In rabbits, SDG reduced hypercholesterolemic atherosclerosis and this effect was associated with a decrease in serum cholesterol, LDL-C, and lipid peroxidation product and an increase in HDL-C and antioxidant reserve.

SDG has been shown to counter oxidative stress in human colonic epithelial tissue and protect against mtDNA damage in vitro, by H2O2 exposure, in a dose-dependent manner, and counters (in-vitro) oxidative stress on heart cells caused by Iron overload.

References 

Lignans
Phenol glucosides